The 2018 AFF Championship Final was the final of the 2018 AFF Championship, the 12th edition of the top-level Association of Southeast Asian Nations (ASEAN) football tournament organised by the ASEAN Football Federation (AFF).

The final was contested in two-legged home-and-away format between Malaysia and Vietnam. The first leg was hosted by Malaysia at the Bukit Jalil National Stadium in Kuala Lumpur on 11 December 2018, while the second leg was hosted by Vietnam at the Mỹ Đình National Stadium in Hanoi on 15 December 2018.

Background 
Based on previous records, Malaysia had reached the AFF Championship final three times (1996, 2010 and 2014) while Vietnam had reached the AFF Championship final two times (1998 and 2008). The two sides last met on 23 November 2016 in the group stage of the previous 2016 AFF Championship. Based on the latest rankings released by FIFA World Rankings on 29 November 2018, Malaysia was ranked 167 while Vietnam ranked 100. Both teams had already won their first trophy of the tournament, with Vietnam winning in 2008 and Malaysia in 2010.

Route to the final 

Both Malaysia and Vietnam were drawn into Group A of the 2018 AFF Championship. After winning three and drawing one in group matches, Vietnam finished first in the group. Malaysia finished second in the group to progress to the knockout phase of the tournament. Vietnam's first match victory was against Laos with a score of 3–0. From there, they continue the path by beating Malaysia by 2–0 and drawing 0–0 with Myanmar before defeating Cambodia by 3–0. Vietnam progressed to the semi-finals to face Group B runner-up of the Philippines. In the first-leg in Bacolod, Vietnam won 2–1 before winning the second-leg in Hanoi by another similar scores of 2–1 with total aggregate of 4–2. Malaysia's won their first match against Cambodia by 1–0 before beating Laos by 3–1. Despite losing to Vietnam by 0–2, they managed to qualify to semi-finals after beating Myanmar by 3–0. In the semi-finals, Malaysia face Group B winner as well the defending champion of the tournament of Thailand. In the first-leg in Kuala Lumpur, they drew 0–0 before drawing 2–2 in the second-leg in Bangkok with a similar total aggregate of 2–2, qualifying through the away goals rule.

Note: In all results below, the score of the finalist is given first (H: home; A: away).

First leg

Second leg

References

External links 
 AFF Suzuki Cup 2018 – Official website

Final
AFF Championship Finals
Malaysia national football team matches
Vietnam national football team matches
December 2018 sports events in Asia
2018 in Malaysian football
2018 in Vietnamese football